{{DISPLAYTITLE:Beta2-adrenergic agonist}}

Beta2-adrenergic agonists, also known as adrenergic β2 receptor agonists, are a class of drugs that act on the β2 adrenergic receptor. Like other β adrenergic agonists, they cause smooth muscle relaxation. β2 adrenergic agonists' effects on smooth muscle cause dilation of bronchial passages, vasodilation in muscle and liver, relaxation of uterine muscle, and release of insulin. They are primarily used to treat asthma and other pulmonary disorders, such as Chronic obstructive pulmonary disease (COPD).

Mechanism of action 

Activation of β adrenergic receptors leads to relaxation of smooth muscle in the lung, and dilation and opening of the airways.

β adrenergic receptors are coupled to a stimulatory G protein of adenylyl cyclase. This enzyme produces the second messenger cyclic adenosine monophosphate (cAMP). In the lung, cAMP decreases calcium concentrations within cells and activates protein kinase A.  Both of these changes inactivate myosin light-chain kinase and activate myosin light-chain phosphatase. In addition, β2 agonists open large conductance calcium-activated potassium channels and thereby tend to hyperpolarize airway smooth muscle cells. The combination of decreased intracellular calcium, increased membrane potassium conductance, and decreased myosin light chain kinase activity leads to smooth muscle relaxation and bronchodilation.

Adverse effects 
Findings indicate that β2 stimulants, especially in parenteral administration such as inhalation or injection, can induce adverse effects:
 Tachycardia secondary to peripheral vasodilation and cardiac stimulation (Such tachycardia may be accompanied by palpitations.)
 Tremor, excessive sweating, anxiety, insomnia, and agitation
More severe effects include paradoxical bronchospasm, hypokalemia, and in rare cases a myocardial infarction. (More severe effects, such as pulmonary edema, myocardial ischemia, and cardiac arrhythmia, are exceptional.)

Overuse of β2 agonists and asthma treatment without proper inhaled corticosteroid use has been associated with an increased risk of asthma exacerbations and asthma-related hospitalizations. The excipients, in particular sulfite, could contribute to the adverse effects.

Delivery 

All β2 agonists are available in inhaler form, either metered-dose inhalers, which aerosolize the drug, or dry powder inhalers, which dispense powder to be inhaled.

Salbutamol (INN) or albuterol (USAN) and some other β2 agonists, such as formoterol, also are sold in a solution form for nebulization, which is more commonly used than inhalers in emergency rooms. Salbutamol and terbutaline are also both available in oral forms. The nebulizer form is as effective as administering the drug intravenously.

In addition, several of these medications are available in intravenous forms, including both salbutamol and terbutaline. It can be used in this form in severe cases of asthma, but it is more commonly used to suppress premature labor because it also relaxes uterine muscle, thereby inhibiting contractions.

Risks 
On 18 November 2005, the U.S. Food and Drug Administration (FDA) alerted healthcare professionals and patients that several long-acting bronchodilator medicines have been associated with possible increased risk of worsening wheezing in some people, and requested that manufacturers update warnings in their existing product labeling.

A 2006 meta-analysis found that "regularly inhaled β agonists (orciprenaline/metaproterenol [Alupent], formoterol [Foradil], fluticasone+salmeterol [Serevent, Advair], and salbutamol/albuterol [Proventil, Ventolin, Volmax, and others]) increased the risk of respiratory death more than two-fold, compared with a placebo," while used to treat chronic obstructive pulmonary disease.
On 11 December 2008, a panel of experts convened by the FDA voted to ban drugs Serevent and Foradil from use in the treatment of asthma. When these two drugs are used without steroids, they increase the risks of more severe attacks. They said that two other, much more popular, asthma drugs containing long-acting β agonists—Advair and Symbicort—should continue to be used.

Types 
They can be divided into short-acting, long-acting, and ultra-long-acting beta adrenoreceptor agonists:

Generic name—Trade name

Short-acting β2 agonists (SABAs) 
 bitolterol—Tornalate
 fenoterol—Berotec
 isoprenaline (INN) or isoproterenol (USAN)—Isuprel
 levosalbutamol (INN) or levalbuterol (USAN)—Xopenex
 orciprenaline (INN) or metaproterenol (USAN)—Alupent
 pirbuterol—Maxair
 procaterol
 ritodrine—Yutopar
 salbutamol (INN) or albuterol (USAN)—Ventolin
 terbutaline—Bricanyl

Long-acting β2 agonists (LABAs) 
 arformoterol—Brovana (some consider it to be an ultra-LABA)
 bambuterol—Bambec, Oxeol
 clenbuterol—Dilaterol, Spiropent
 formoterol—Foradil, Oxis, Perforomist
 salmeterol—Serevent

Ultra-long-acting β2 agonists 
 abediterol
 carmoterol
 indacaterol—Arcapta Neohaler (U.S.), Onbrez Breezhaler (EU, RU)
 olodaterol—Striverdi Respimat
 vilanterol
 with umeclidinium bromide—Anoro Ellipta
 with fluticasone furoate—Breo Ellipta (U.S.), Relvar Ellipta (EU, RU)
 with fluticasone furoate and umeclidinium bromide—Trelegy Ellipta

Unknown duration of action 
 isoxsuprine
 mabuterol
 zilpaterol—Zilmax

Society and culture
β2 agonists are used by athletes and bodybuilders as anabolic performance-enhancing drugs and their use has been banned by the World Anti-Doping Agency except for certain drugs that people with asthma may use; they are also used illegally to try to promote the growth of livestock. A 2011 meta-analysis found no evidence that inhaled β₂-agonists improve performance in healthy athletes and found that the evidence was too weak to assess whether systemic administration of β₂-agonists improved performance in healthy people.

See also 
 Discovery and development of β2 agonists
 β3-adrenergic agonist

References

External links 
 

 
World Anti-Doping Agency prohibited substances